George Cecil Jaffe (16 January 1880 in Moscow – 18 March 1965), received his doctorate in chemistry in 1903 from the University of Leipzig, where he studied under Nobel laureate Wilhelm Ostwald. He worked briefly at Cambridge and then the Curie Laboratory, where he worked with both J.J. Thomson and Pierre Curie. He eventually rose to full professor at the University of Giessen, however, with the rise of Naziism he was dismissed from his position. He eventually immigrated to the US and became a professor at Louisiana State University.

Jaffe is best known for his classic paper "Zur Theorie der Ionisation in Kolonnen" (Theory of columnar ionization), which was published in 1913. In it he proposes a model for charge recombination and charge collection efficiency for a "column" of charge generated by ionizing radiation.

References

External links 
Finding Aid to the George C. Jaffé Papers, 1902-1962 at The Bancroft Library

1880 births
1965 deaths
Russian chemists
Scientists from Moscow
Academic staff of the University of Giessen
Louisiana State University faculty